A paint thinner is a solvent used to thin oil-based paints. Solvents labeled "paint thinner" are usually mineral spirits having a flash point at about 40 °C (104 °F), the same as some popular brands of charcoal starter.

Common solvents historically used as paint thinners include:
 Mineral spirits (North America)/White spirit (United Kingdom and Ireland)
 Acetone
 Turpentine
 Naphtha
 Toluene
 Lacquer thinner
 Methyl ethyl ketone (MEK)
 Dimethylformamide (DMF)
 2-Butoxyethanol, or any of the other glycol ethers

Less common solvents used as paint thinner include:
 Ethylbenzene
 Xylene
 n-Butyl acetate
 Butanol

Exposure to vapors created by paint containing thinner or its cleanup may be hazardous. The American Conference of Governmental Industrial Hygienists has established threshold limit values (TLVs) for most of these compounds. TLV is defined as the maximum concentration in air which can be breathed by a normal person (i.e., excluding children, pregnant women, etc.) in the course of 40 hours per week (a typical American work week), day after day through their work life without long-term ill effects.

In underdeveloped countries, workers commonly experience much higher exposure to these chemicals with consequent damage to their health.

Addiction 
Paint thinners are often used as an inhalant, due to its accessibility and legality as a drug. Many teenagers become addicted to thinner and due to lack of knowledge, parents and caregivers do not notice it or give it much attention.

See also
 Environmental impact of paint

References

Solvents
Paints